Nikolay Ivanov (born 21 April 1971) is a Kazakhstani cross-country skier. He competed in the men's 10 kilometre classical event at the 1994 Winter Olympics.

References

1971 births
Living people
Sportspeople from Kokshetau
Kazakhstani male cross-country skiers
Olympic cross-country skiers of Kazakhstan
Cross-country skiers at the 1994 Winter Olympics
Cross-country skiers at the 1996 Asian Winter Games
20th-century Kazakhstani people